The Bengaluru India Temple is a temple of the Church of Jesus Christ of Latter-day Saints under construction in Bengaluru, India.

History
The intent to construct the temple was announced by church president Russell M. Nelson on April 1, 2018. The Bengaluru India Temple was announced concurrently with 6 other temples. At the time, the number of operating or announced temples was 189. 

On December 2, 2020, a groundbreaking to signify beginning of construction was held, with Robert K. William, an area seventy, presiding.  This will be the first temple in India.

See also

 The Church of Jesus Christ of Latter-day Saints in India
 Comparison of temples of The Church of Jesus Christ of Latter-day Saints
 List of temples of The Church of Jesus Christ of Latter-day Saints
 List of temples of The Church of Jesus Christ of Latter-day Saints by geographic region
 Temple architecture (Latter-day Saints)

References

External links
Bengaluru India Temple Official announcement
Bengaluru India Temple at ChurchofJesusChristTemples.org

Temples (LDS Church) in Asia
Proposed religious buildings and structures of the Church of Jesus Christ of Latter-day Saints
The Church of Jesus Christ of Latter-day Saints in India
Religious buildings and structures in India
Proposed buildings and structures in India
21st-century Latter Day Saint temples